Lac-à-la-Croix is an unorganized territory in the Canadian province of Quebec, located in the La Mitis Regional County Municipality.

See also
 List of unorganized territories in Quebec

References

Unorganized territories in Bas-Saint-Laurent